"Let It Show" may refer to

"Let It Show", song by Flavor Flav from Flavor Flav (album)
"Let It Show", song by Tyga from Careless World: Rise of the Last King
"Let It Show", song by Riot from Through the Storm (Riot album)
"Let It Show", song by John Schlitt from Shake (John Schlitt album)
"Let It Show", song by Sally Shapiro from My Guilty Pleasure 
"Let It Show", song by Teenage Head from Some Kinda Fun
"Let It Show", song by Guy Finley  1975